The 62nd Massachusetts General Court, consisting of the Massachusetts Senate and the Massachusetts House of Representatives, met in 1841 during the governorship of John Davis. Daniel P. King served as president of the Senate and George Ashmun served as speaker of the House.

Senators

Representatives

Ezra W. Wilkinson

See also
 27th United States Congress
 List of Massachusetts General Courts

References

External links
 
 

Political history of Massachusetts
Massachusetts legislative sessions
massachusetts
1841 in Massachusetts